Gevorg Gorgisyan (born 23 January 1986), is an Armenian politician, Member of the National Assembly of Armenia and the secretary of Bright Armenia faction.

References 

1986 births
Living people
21st-century Armenian politicians
Politicians from Yerevan
Bright Armenia politicians